Moses Yale Beach (January 7, 1800 – July 18, 1868) was an American inventor, entrepreneur, philanthropist and publisher, who started the Associated Press, and is credited with originating print syndication. His fortune, as of 1846, amounted to $300,000, which was about 1/4 of the fortune of Cornelius Vanderbilt at the time, and was featured in a book that he published named the Wealthy citizens of the City of New York. His newspaper, the New York Sun, became the most successful newspaper in America, and was a pioneer on crime reporting and human-interest stories for the masses.

Biography

Moses was born in Wallingford, Connecticut, to Moses Sperry Beach and Lucretia Yale, and was a cousin of Canadian fur trader James Murray Yale and Gov. Elihu Yale of Yale University. His grandfather, Captain Elihu Yale (1747), was a bayonet manufacturer during the American Revolutionary War, and one of the largest landholders of Wallingford. His father was a plain farmer, and gave him an ordinary education. As a boy, he was a fifer in the War of 1812 at Fort Nathan Hale. He showed a mechanical aptitude from an early age, and at 14 was apprenticed to a cabinetmaker. Before his term was up, he purchased his freedom and established a cabinet-making business in Northampton, Massachusetts.  The business failed, and he moved to Springfield. There he endeavoured to manufacture a gunpowder engine for propelling balloons; but this enterprise was also a failure. 

He was among the first to invest in paddle steamships to open steam navigation on the Connecticut river between Hartford and Springfield, and would have succeeded if financial difficulties had not obliged him to cease operations before his steamer was completed. He then invented a rag-cutting machine for paper mills.  The invention was widely used, but Moses derived no pecuniary benefit due to his tardiness in applying for a patent. He then settled in Ulster County, New York, where he invested in an extensive paper mill. At first he was successful, and after six years was wealthy; but after seven years, an imprudent investment dispersed his fortune, and was compelled to abandon his enterprise. In 1829, he became one of the trustees of Saugerties, N.Y., organizing their fire department, and purchased the first fire engine of the city.

In the meantime though, he had married the sister of Benjamin Day, founder and proprietor of the New York Sun. In 1835, he acquired an interest in the paper from George W. Wisner, an early founder who had been in charge of reporting police news and writing police reports, being the first to do so in the industry. His brother was Gov. Moses Wisner, a member of the family of Patriot Henry Wisner, a gunpowder manufacturer for George Washington during the Revolutionary War. After selling his shares, he would go back to Michigan and found his own journal. The Sun was then small, both in the size of its sheet and circulation, and with a $40,000 payment, Moses soon became sole proprietor, acquiring the shares of Benjamin Day and Mr. Wisner.

The New York Sun, as a penny press journal, brought many innovations to the industry, such as being the first U.S. journal to hire a Police reporter. They were also the first newspaper to report crimes and personal events such as suicides, deaths, and divorces, which featured everyday people rather than public figures. As the early developers of the craft of reporting and storytelling, they changed journalism, and brought a new business model focused on mass-production and advertising rather than subscriptions. With the breakthrough of selling their newspaper for a penny, a very low price affordable to most, it got New Yorkers from all walks of life reading the news and stay informed. They also launched hoaxes with the aim of attracting attention, such as the Great Moon Hoax of 1835 or The Balloon-Hoax. Theses innovations led the journal to eventually become the most successful newspaper in America.

James Gordon Bennett Sr., intrigued by the success of the New York Sun, would go on and copy the paper and found his own journal in 1835, naming it the New York Herald. Through his 10 years of proprietorship, Moses would expand the four-page paper from three to eight columns. He would also later develop horse, rail, and pigeon services to accelerate the speed of news-gathering into his New York offices. According to historian Elmo Scott Watson, Moses invented print syndication in 1841 when he produced a two-page supplement and sold it to a score of newspapers in the U.S. northeast. He also became the major shareholder in four banks and started being a banker himself, establishing banks in the states of New York, New Jersey, Pennsylvania, Maryland, and Florida. During the California Gold Rush, he sent the Apollo storeship with his sons Henry and John to San Francisco, and equipped the vessel to become a profitable business venture. He also later acquired the American book publishing company Harper Brothers. The ruins of the ship are now buried in the underground of the Old Federal Reserve Bank Building of San Francisco, and two rooms are named after the ship.

In 1842, he published the first directory of wealthy Americans called the Wealth and Pedigree of Wealthy Citizens of New York City. In the 1846 edition, Moses Yale Beach was featured with a fortune of US$300,000, which translates to 3.3 billions dollars in 2022 money in relation to GDP, and was featured along with Cornelius Vanderbilt at 1.2 million, and John Jacob Astor at 25 millions, the richest man in the world at the time.

In 1843, he was appointed United States Ambassador to Mexico, and named Special Diplomatic Agent by U.S. President John Tyler.

In May 1846, Moses organized the Associated Press (at that time publisher of The Sun), and was joined by the New York Herald, the New York Courier, The Journal of Commerce, and the New York Evening Express. The AP had been formed by the five New York daily papers to share the cost of transmitting news of the Mexican–American War. Their offices would later be at 50 Rockefeller Plaza, formerly known as the Associated Press Building, and be part of Rockefeller Center.

Mexican-American War

During the Mexican–American War, Moses went on a trip to Washington where he met with Secretary of State James Buchanan and U.S. President James K. Polk for talks. His mission, as the President personal spy, would be to try to persuade the Mexican government to settle its ongoing war with the United States. As he already had a personal relationship with the former foreign minister of Mexico, Juan Almonte, President Polk sent him to Mexico to arrange a treaty of peace, bringing with him his daughter and a journalist named Jane Cazneau. Arrived on Mexican grounds, Moses received informations from General Mirabeau Lamar, the former president of the Republic of Texas, about the disenchantment of the Mexican bishops and clergy, as they were penalized by the War.

He took meetings with them and tried to organize a resistance. His resistance would prove successful as the Bishops were able to raise an army of 5,000 men. The financing provided also prevented the Mexican army to counterback U.S General Winfield Scott. Following the Polkos Revolt, President Santa Anna would post a reward to capture Moses and declared that anyone found with a copy of his paper, the New York Sun, would be punished as a traitor. The negotiations were eventually broken off by a false report announcing the defeat of General Zachary Taylor by Mexican General Antonio López de Santa Anna. Moses returned back home, along with General Scott, and eventually the Treaty of Guadalupe Hidalgo would be settled, in 1847, where the territories of California, Nevada, Utah, Colorado, New Mexico, along with parts of Texas and Arizona, would be obtained by the United States.

Governor Sam Houston declared that Texas owes much to the work of Moses Yale Beach during the war.

Personal life 

Moses retired in 1857 with an ample fortune, and left the paper to his sons. He then returned to Wallingford, Connecticut, built the most luxurious Italianate house in the city, and engaged in local philanthropy. The Moses Y. Beach Elementary School would later bore his name, following a land donation from him. He also gave $100,000 to the Union Army for the American Civil War and installed a 110 foot tall Liberty Pole in the city.

His son Moses Sperry took over the journal, and under his leadership, they supported Abraham Lincoln, and were described as out-and-out loyalists. The paper also covered his day of election as well as his assassination.

Moses Yale Beach was married twice and left six sons and two daughters :
Alfred Ely, entrepreneur who invented New York City's first subway system, opposed by John Jacob Astor III, owner of the Scientific American magazine, founder of a school for freed slaves after the American Civil War, joined the Union League
Moses Sperry, politician, co owner of the New York Sun and the Boston Daily Times, featured in Mark Twain's book, The Innocents Abroad, member of the New York State Assembly, visited the Czar Alexander II of the House of Romanov, supported Abraham Lincoln policies
As well as Eveline Shepherd, Mary Ely Day, Henry Day, Joseph Perkins, Moses Yale Beach (b. 1862), and William Yale Beach, a Freemason banker and real estate developer, doing business in the Masonic Temples of New York and Boston, among others.

His granddaughter, Emma Beach, married to naturalist and artist Abbott Handerson Thayer, who pioneered the creation of the first effective forms of military camouflage. She was also credited with illustrations in the book Concealing Coloration in the Animal Kingdom and was described in Mark Twain's The Innocents Abroad.

His grandson, Frederick C. Beach, ran the family owned Scientific American Magazine, seated at the Woolworth Building, and invented a photolithographic process. The magazine is now the  oldest continuously published magazine in the United States.

His great-grandson, Stanley Yale Beach, was also an aviation pioneer and airship entrepreneur. He was a correspondent of Howard Hughes and General Billy Mitchell, father of the United States Air Force, and an early financier of another aviation pioneer, Gustave Whitehead, who claimed to have made a powered controlled airplane flight before the Wright brothers.

References

External links

 

19th-century American inventors
People from Wallingford, Connecticut
19th-century American newspaper publishers (people)
Beach family
1800 births
1868 deaths
19th-century American diplomats
Associated Press people
19th-century American journalists
American male journalists
Ambassadors of the United States to Mexico